Ariel Álvarez Leyva (born 9 May 1973) is a Cuban retired footballer who played at international levels, as a midfielder.

Club career
Álvarez played his entire career for local side Villa Clara, except for half a season in Germany with Bonner SC, when then Cuban leader Fidel Castro approved for the whole Cuban team to join the German 4th level side for part of the 1998/99 season.

International career
He played at the 1989 FIFA U-16 World Championship and made his senior international debut for Cuba in 1995 and has earned a total of 53 caps, scoring 8 goals. He represented his country in 16 FIFA World Cup qualifying matches.

His final international was an August 2001 CONCACAF Gold Cup qualification match against Panama.

International goals
Scores and results list Cuba's goal tally first.

Managerial career
After retiring as a player, Álvarez became coach of Villa Clara.

References

External links 
 
 

1973 births
Living people
People from Caibarién
Association football midfielders
Cuban footballers
Cuba international footballers
FC Villa Clara players
Bonner SC players
Cuban expatriate footballers
Expatriate footballers in Germany
Cuban expatriate sportspeople in Germany
Cuban football managers
1998 CONCACAF Gold Cup players